My Neighbor, Charles is a South Korean television series that premiered on  on KBS 1TV.

Episodes

2015

2016

2017

2018 

: This special was uploaded onto KBS World's YouTube channel as episode 37. The original broadcast of episode 37 has not been uploaded.
:Episode broadcasts from September 12 to February 20 were not aired due to KBS' strike, and were occasionally replaced by special episodes.

2019

2020

2021

2022

2023

2019

2020

2021

2022

2023

References

External links
 My Neighbor, Charles at KBS 1TV 
KBS World TV on YouTube: My Neighbor, Charles
Namu.wiki: My Neighbor, Charles 

Lists of South Korean television series episodes